Kevin Connors is a sports television journalist for ESPN.  He is among the most versatile studio hosts in sports television, handling ESPN's coverage of college basketball and college football, as well as Baseball Tonight. He is also a regular anchor on SportsCenter. In addition, Connors handles play-by-play duties for college basketball and Major League Baseball broadcasts on ESPN, anchored ESPN's coverage of the 2022 Special Olympics USA Games and writes a weekly column on ESPN.com focusing on the top mid-major teams in college basketball.  He was previously a sports reporter and sports anchor for WCBS-TV, the flagship station of CBS in New York City.

Biography
Connors joined ESPN in 2008 after serving as the WCBS Newsradio 880 PM Drive Sports Anchor for two and a half years. During his tenure at WCBS, Connors also became the weekend sports anchor for WCBS-TV (CBS 2). Previously, Connors spent eight years in television as the Sports Director/Anchor at Regional News Network (RNN-TV).

The New York State Broadcasters Association has honored Connors on four occasions. In 1999, 2003 and 2004 for "Outstanding Sportscast," and in 2001 for “Outstanding Documentary” on the ‘Our Town to Cooperstowne’ series profiling seven members of the Baseball Hall of Fame, from the tri-state region. Connors was also honored by the New York State Associated Press Broadcaster’s Association in 2003 for his feature reporting of Army football, and nominated for a New York State Emmy Award in 2004 for his work on Army football.

A native of Rockville Centre, New York, Connors attended South Side High School where he was an All-County basketball player. A four-year letter winner on the Ithaca College men's basketball team, Connors graduated from Ithaca's Park School of Communications.

Connors also is a Buffalo Bills, New York Yankees and Syracuse Orange fan.

He is married to former ice dancer and 2000 World Junior silver medallist Emilie Nussear.

References

American television journalists
New York (state) television reporters
Television anchors from New York City
Year of birth missing (living people)
Living people
College basketball announcers in the United States
College football announcers
People from Rockville Centre, New York
American male journalists
South Side High School (Rockville Centre) alumni
Ithaca Bombers men's basketball players